Moose Falls (height ) is a plunge type waterfall on Crawfish Creek in Yellowstone National Park. The waterfall was named in 1885 by members of the Arnold Hague Geologic Survey for the plentiful moose found in the southern sections of the park.

See also
 Waterfalls in Yellowstone National Park

Notes

Waterfalls of Wyoming
Waterfalls of Yellowstone National Park
Waterfalls of Teton County, Wyoming